Thomas Peter Wayne McGill (born 25 March 2000) is a professional footballer who plays as a goalkeeper for Brighton & Hove Albion. He has previously had loan spells at Worthing, Greenwich Borough, Basingstoke Town and Crawley Town. Born in Canada, he has represented the England U17 internationally.

Club career
Born in Canada, McGill joined Brighton & Hove Albion's academy in 2014, aged 14, having moved to England at a young age. On 30 July 2018, McGill joined Worthing on a season-long loan. However, on 6 August 2018, his loan at Worthing was cancelled, after Lucas Covolan signed a new contract at Worthing. On 31 August 2018, he joined Greenwich Borough on a loan deal until 4 January 2019. On 11 January 2019, he joined Basingstoke Town on loan until the end of the season, for whom he made 11 league appearances. In July 2019, McGill signed a new two-year contract, extending his stay at the club until 2021.

On 24 January 2020, he joined EFL League Two club Crawley Town on loan until the end of the season, before rejoining Crawley on a season-long loan deal on 2 September 2020. His professional debut came on 5 September 2020 in a 3–1 EFL Cup defeat at home to Millwall. McGill made his Football League debut on 3 November 2020, coming on as a substitute for injured Glenn Morris in a 1–0 away defeat at Walsall. He started Crawley's following match on 8 November – a 6–5 FA Cup victory over Torquay United – but suffered a head injury shortly into the second half, leaving him unconscious, and was substituted off for Stuart Nelson. On 12 January 2021, McGill was recalled from his loan spell by his parent club Brighton & Hove Albion.

He was named in a Brighton matchday squad for the first time on 3 February 2021 staying on the bench alongside fellow goalkeeper Christian Walton in a 1–0 away win against defending champions Liverpool claiming their first league win at Anfield since 1982.

International career 
McGill earned six caps for the England under-17's.

In March 2019, McGill was involved with England under-19's but remained uncapped.

On 16 March 2023 he accepted a call up to the senior Canada national team.

Career statistics

References

External links
 
 Greenwich Borough stats

2000 births
Living people
Sportspeople from Belleville, Ontario
English footballers
England youth international footballers
Canadian soccer players
Canadian emigrants to England
Brighton & Hove Albion F.C. players
Worthing F.C. players
Basingstoke Town F.C. players
Crawley Town F.C. players
Association football goalkeepers
English Football League players
Greenwich Borough F.C. players
Southern Football League players